Eravalam is a tiny village in Tirukoilur, Kallakurichi district, Tamil Nadu, India. A new sugar mill is planned,  spread across the villages of Venmar, Eravalam, Kachikuppam and Keezhthazhanur, and this has generated some controversy.

Main cultivation of the village
 Sugar cane
 Paddy
 Ragi
 Maravalli

References

Villages in Kallakurichi district